The 4th Regiment of Marines was a British Army regiment that saw service between 1739 and 1748. The regiment served during the War of Jenkins' Ear and fought at the Battle of Cartagena.

History 
The 4th Regiment of Marines was raised on 17 November 1739 as John Wynyard's Regiment of Marines. Following the 18th century tradition of naming British regiments for their colonel, the regiment was renamed as Byng's Regiment of Marines in 1742.

The regiment embarked from Portsmouth on 4 November 1740 en route for the West Indies for service in the War of Jenkins' Ear. It fought at the Battle of Cartagena de Indias in March 1741. The regiment was ranked as the 47th regiment of the line in 1747 and was also known as the 4th Marines.

The regiment was disbanded on 8 November 1748 when the British Army disbanded its marine regiments. The final commander of the 4th Marines was Colonel James Long.

References 

Infantry regiments of the British Army
Disbanded marine forces
Military units and formations established in 1739
Military units and formations disestablished in 1748
1739 establishments in Great Britain
Marine regiments